HD 89307 b is an extrasolar planet orbiting the star HD 89307 located approximately 108 light-years away in the constellation of Leo. The planet takes 187 megaseconds to orbit (roughly 2164 days or 5.9 years). The planet's minimum mass is 1.92 MJ since the inclination is unknown. As it is typical for most of the long-period planets, the eccentricity is greater than any planets in the Solar System, orbiting at the average distance of 491 gigameters. The speed of the wobble caused by the planet's gravity is 31 meters per second. The average orbital velocity is 16.6 m/s.

References

External links
 
 

Leo (constellation)
Exoplanets discovered in 2004
Giant planets
Exoplanets detected by radial velocity